Lisnarick may refer to:
Lisnarick, County Antrim, a townland in County Antrim, Northern Ireland
Lisnarick, County Fermanagh, a small village in County Fermanagh, Northern Ireland